The 25 June 2011 Logar province bombing was a suicide car bombing that occurred on 25 June 2011 in Azra District, Logar Province, Afghanistan targeting Akbar Khail hospital, a 10-bed facility near the Pakistani border, killing at least 43 people, including children, pregnant women, and medical staff. The suicide bomber drove a sport utility vehicle through the front gate of the facility, striking a guard, before detonating his explosives. The blast destroyed the one-story hospital and buried people under the rubble. The Taliban denied responsibility for the attack, claiming the perpetrator to be  "someone with an agenda," possibly the Haqqani network.

References

Sources 
 At least 20 killed in suicide bombing in east Afghanistan. Retrieved: 25 September 2011.
 Afghanistan suicide attack kills 35. Retrieved: 25 September 2011.

2011 murders in Afghanistan
Mass murder in 2011
Mass murder in Afghanistan
Terrorist incidents in Afghanistan in 2011
Suicide car and truck bombings in Afghanistan
Logar Province
June 2011 events in Afghanistan
Attacks on buildings and structures in Afghanistan
Attacks in Afghanistan in 2011